Lodomillo Township is a township in Clayton County, Iowa, USA.  As of the 2000 census, its population was 719.

History
The origin of the name Lodomillo is unclear. It might mean "load a mill" or "load of watermelons".

Geography
According to the USGS, it contains two cemeteries: Green Hill and Noble.

Notes

References
 USGS Geographic Names Information System (GNIS)

External links
 US-Counties.com
 City-Data.com

Townships in Clayton County, Iowa
Townships in Iowa